Yosef Elron (born 20 September 1955) is an Israeli judge who currently serves as a Justice in the Supreme Court of Israel.

Early life and education
Elron was born in Haifa, the youngest of nine children born to Ovadia and Tzadika Alfarih, Iraqi Jewish immigrants to Israel originally from Mosul. After graduating from "Erev Hadash" high school in Haifa, he served in the Israel Defense Forces from 1973 to 1977. After being discharged in 1977 with the rank of lieutenant, he moved to the United Kingdom. He worked in various security organizations from 1977 to 1980 and studied law at the University of Buckingham. After graduating with an LLB in 1983, he returned to Israel, where he clerked in a law firm and the Haifa District Attorney's Office. He completed an MA in National Security Administration at the University of Haifa in 2001.

Legal career
After being admitted to the Israel Bar Association in 1985, Elron opened a law office in Haifa and practiced law as an attorney dealing in criminal and civil law from 1985 to 1994. In 1994, he was appointed a judge on the Haifa Magistrate's Court, and in 2003 was appointed a judge on the Haifa District Court. In 2010, while continuing to serve on the Haifa District Court, he was appointed a judge on the Military Court of Appeals as part of his military reserve duty, with the rank of lieutenant colonel. In 2012, he was appointed Deputy President of the Haifa District Court. The following year he was appointed President of that Court and served in this role for over four years (July 2013-October 2017). As a District Court judge and as the President of the District Court, he heard dozens of severe crime cases as the Chair of the judicial panel.

In addition, he took part in various committees aiming to improve and optimize the Israel judicial system:  he chaired the Judicial Measurable Objectives committee, and served as a member of the Integration Committee of the Israel Judicial System Strategic Plan. He also served as a member of the judicial selection committee and between the years 2014-2018, he served as the Chairman of the Israel Bar Association's Examination Committee.

In February 2017, Elron was appointed a Supreme Court Justice. He assumed the position on 30 October 2017.

As a Supreme Court Justice, Supreme Court Chief Justice Esther Hayut requested Elron to chair a committee that examined the interactions between judges and attorneys in legal proceedings relating to criminal investigations, before indicting a suspect. The Committee's conclusions underscored, among other things, the importance of transparency in legal proceedings. These later contributed to the formulation of new Rules of Conduct, which came into force during September 2018, and wished to provide comprehensive guidelines for the proper nature of the interactions between judges and attorneys.

Elron often reiterates the importance of the relationship between the Courts and the individual citizen, for which "the encounter with the courts is, often, a charged and exciting encounter, and sometimes the most dramatic encounter in his life". In this context, he expressed concern of a great deal of distrust among the public in the judicial system, and stressed that the judicial system should strive to gain public trust, on which its legitimacy is based.

This general approach is rooted in his rulings in various fields of law, as he frequently strives to empower citizens who suffer mistreatment from government authorities. Particularly, Justice Elron ruled that police forces must avoid using excessive force while performing riot control against demonstrators.

Justice Elron's rulings in criminal law are characterized by a strict and uncompromising defense of defendants' rights. In several cases Justice Elron criticized the investigative authorities, which exceeded their authority and violated the rights of defendants and suspects. Justice Elron's ruling regarding illegal cell phone searches conducted by the police is a striking example of this approach. He harshly criticized such misconduct and ruled that in some instances, such actions could block future requests for search warrants. In another case, Judge Elron criticized the prosecution for not transferring all relevant investigative materials to the defendant. He ruled that such misconduct might justify granting the defendant permission to withdraw his confession to the offenses attributed to him.

Alongside this, Justice Elron does not spare criticism on the lengthiness of criminal proceedings while the defendant is in custody. In this context, he often orders the courts to speed up the hearings and bring the proceedings to an end. In several groundbreaking decisions, he clarified that extradition requests do not automatically establish grounds for his arrest. Nevertheless, when approving the extradition requests, he often underscores that Israel shall not provide shelter for criminals and stresses that when the conditions for extradition are met, it should be carried swiftly.

At the same time, Justice Elron espouses a conservative jurisprudence. He routinely emphasizes that "the court reviewing an administrative decision does not replace the administrative authority's discretion in making its own decision, and does not interfere with the decision even if a better decision could be made." Additionally, he stressed that the court should avoid practicing judicial review in disputes between the legislative and executive branches, and at any rate, not intervene before allowing an adequate opportunity to resolve such disputes amicably.

Notably, his judgments underscore the broad discretion given to the prosecution authorities in deciding whether to open a criminal investigation and to determine whether to prosecute a person. Nevertheless, he emphasized that in extreme situations, a decision to prosecute a person might be unreasonable and declared void by the criminal court.

In one case, Justice Elron ruled that the Court should not overturn the Attorney General's decision not to prosecute General Security Services Interrogators for torture. Elron found that the petitioners failed to prove that the security services practiced violent measures against the interrogated suspect; and that the "special measures" practiced by the Security Services were necessary for the immediate thwarting of "a tangible threat of harm to human life". The ruling also rejected the petition for cancellation of the Security Services directive, allowing investigators to consult with senior officials about their use of "special measures" during the interrogations. Supreme Court Chief Justice Esther Hayut rejected the request for further hearing on the ruling.

Justice Elron rejected a petition against the Foreign Ministry's policy to allow leaders who allegedly participated in crimes against humanity and war crimes to visit at Yad Vashem Museum. He emphasized that various considerations may support this policy since one of the objectives of Yad Vashem to convey an educational lesson for future generations and discourage leaders from committing such crimes.

Works

 The Investigating Judge Under the Investigation of Causes of Death Law, 5718-1958 SHAMGAR'S BOOK – Articles, Part II (The Israel Bar Association Publishing House, 5763-2003):  In this article, he reviewed the court rulings concerning the cause of death investigation by a judge, and discussed the increasing use of this procedure and the application of the existing law.
 Acceptance of Evidence not under Law Procedure ADI AZAR'S BOOK – 12 HAMISHPAT (2007): In this paper, Elron discussed the legal framework for submitting evidence of non-compliance with a focus on criminal law, and suggested that in deciding the trial court's decision to allow further non-timely evidence, it would consider the standards that guide the appeals Court.
 Probation Survey and Victim Survey: Legal and Ethical Considerations in ISSUES IN PSYCHOLOGY, LAW AND ETHICS IN ISRAEL, DIAGNOSIS, TREATMENT AND JUDGMENT (Diunon Publishing House, 2008): In this article, he discussed the difficulty of making the content of the reports in the course of the criminal proceedings public, and suggested, among other things, that the authors of the reports and the professional opinion expressed their views on the matter when submitting their reports.
 Opposing Psychiatric Opinions – The Considerations Underlying the Judicial Decision in APPLIED ISSUES IN LEGAL PSYCHOLOGY (Probook Publishing House, 2011): In this article, Elron offered several rules of thumb to decide between conflicting psychiatric opinions, and demonstrated them through court rulings on the matter.

References

1955 births
Living people
Judges of the Supreme Court of Israel
People from Haifa
Alumni of the University of Buckingham
University of Haifa alumni
20th-century Israeli judges
21st-century Israeli judges
Israeli people of Iraqi-Jewish descent